Chrysallida cancellata is a species of sea snail, a marine gastropod mollusk in the family Pyramidellidae, the pyrams and their allies. The species is one of many species within the Chrysallida genus of gastropods.

Distribution
This marine species mainly occurs throughout American waters, these include the following locations:
 Caribbean Sea
 Cuba
 Gulf of Mexico
 Lesser Antilles
 North West Atlantic Ocean

The species ranges from approximately 36.5°N to 12°N; 93.5°W to 65°W, these coordinates cover the United States, Virginia, North Carolina, Louisiana; Cuba; Virgin Islands and St. Thomas.

References

External links
 To Encyclopedia of Life
 To ITIS
 To World Register of Marine Species

cancellata
Gastropods described in 1841